Sercomyia are large flies with species that are bee mimics both short pile and long pile.
Sericomyiine flower flies are common in boreal forests across the Holarctic region and southward at higher elevations into the Oriental and Neotropical regions.
Sericomyia species have larvae of the rat-tailed maggot type, often found  in ponds rich in decomposing vegetation where they filter out microorganisms as their
food

Description

They have an oval flagellum with a plumose arista. The eye are bare and narrowly to
broadly holoptic in male. The wings are darkly colored along the anterior margin. 
Cell r1 is open. The  stigmatic crossvein is absent. The cell
r4+5 with long petiole, longer than humeral crossvein. 
The vein R4+5 is straight to moderately sinuate.

Species

Subgenus: Sericomyia
S. arctica Schirmer, 1913
S. bifasciata Williston, 1887
S. carolinensis (Metcalf, 1917)
S. chalcopyga Loew, 1863
S. chrysotoxoides Macquart, 1842
S. dux (Stackelberg, 1930)
S. hispanica Peris Torres, 1962
S. jakutica (Stackelberg, 1927)
S. lappona (Linnaeus, 1758)
S. lata (Coquillett, 1907)
S. militaris Walker, 1849
S. nigra Portschinsky, 1873
S. sachalinica Stackelberg, 1926
S. sexfasciata Walker, 1849
S. silentis (Harris, 1776)
S. slossonae Curran, 1934
S. transversa (Osburn, 1926)

Subgenus: Arctophila
S. bequaerti (Hervé-Bazin, 1913)
S. bombiformis (Fallén, 1810)
S. flagrans (Osten Sacken, 1875)
S. harveyi (Osburn, 1908)
S. meyeri (Fluke, 1939)
S. superbiens (Müller, 1776)

Subgenus: Conosyrphus
S. tolli (Frey, 1915)

Gallery

References

Diptera of Europe
Diptera of Asia
Diptera of North America
Hoverfly genera
Eristalinae
Taxa named by Johann Wilhelm Meigen